Maea David (born 27 February 1972) is a New Zealand rugby union coach and former professional rugby league footballer who played professionally in England and Australia.

Playing career
David played in the Canterbury Rugby League competition for the Papanui Tigers and made his Canterbury début in 1992. He also made the Kiwi Colts that year. David made the 1993 New Zealand national rugby league team trials but did not make the final squad. He played for the Canterbury Country Cardinals in the inaugural Lion Red Cup.

In 1994 he signed with Hull FC, and moved to England.

He spent the 1996 and 1997 seasons with the Illawarra Steelers, playing in 11 first grade matches.

David then returned to Hull for 1998's Super League III season.

David also played for Featherstone Rovers and Doncaster Dragons

Later years
David joined the Hull RUFC, playing for the club before becoming the backs coach under former teammate, Tevita Vaikona.

References

1972 births
Living people
Canterbury rugby league team players
Doncaster R.L.F.C. players
Featherstone Rovers players
Hull F.C. players
Illawarra Steelers players
New Zealand rugby league players
New Zealand rugby union coaches
New Zealand rugby union players
Papanui Tigers players
Rugby league centres